In March 2021, the Suez Canal was blocked for six days by the , a container ship that had run aground in the canal. The ,  vessel was buffeted by strong winds on the morning of 23 March, and ended up wedged across the waterway with its bow and stern stuck in the canal banks, blocking all traffic until it could be freed. Egyptian authorities said that "technical or human errors" may have also been involved. The obstruction occurred south of the section of the canal that had two channels, so there was no way for other ships to bypass Ever Given. The Suez Canal Authority (SCA) engaged Boskalis through its subsidiary Smit International to manage marine salvage operations. As one of the world's busiest trade routes, the canal obstruction had a significant negative impact on trade between Europe, Asia and the Middle East.

On 28 March, at least 369 ships were queuing to pass through the canal. This prevented an estimated US$9.6 billion worth of trade. On 29 March, Ever Given was partially re-floated and moved by about 80 percent in the correct direction, although the bow remained stuck until the ship was finally freed by Egyptian, Dutch, and Italian tugs at 15:05 EGY (13:05 UTC) and started moving, under tow, towards the Great Bitter Lake, for technical inspection. The canal was checked for damage, and after being found to be sound, the SCA allowed shipping to resume from 19:00 EGY (17:00 UTC) on 29 March. The vessel was subsequently impounded by the Egyptian government on 13 April 2021 for refusing to pay compensations demanded by the government, a claim deemed to be unjustified by the ship's insurers. After the incident, the Egyptian government announced that they will be widening the narrower parts of the canal.

A formal settlement between the owners and insurers of the ship, and the canal authority, was finally reached in July. The ship set sail again on 7 July 2021 after having been legally stuck in the canal since it had been dislodged, stopping for inspections at Port Said before continuing on its journey to the port of Rotterdam.

Background 

The Suez Canal, one of the world's most important trading routes, was opened in 1869. By 2021, approximately fifty ships per day travelled through the canal, about 12 per cent of total global trade at the time. For much of its length, however, the canal is not wide enough to allow traffic to travel in both directions at once; convoys of ships must take turns transiting these segments of the waterway. An expansion project is underway, but significant portions of the canal remain single-laned.

 (IMO 9811000) was laid down on 25 December 2015, launched 9 May 2018, and completed 25 September 2018, replacing an earlier ship of the same name (IMO 8320901). Registered in Panama, she is owned by Shoei Kisen Kaisha, a Japanese firm.  Leased to the Taiwan-based container shipping company Evergreen Marine for operation, she was managed by Bernhard Schulte Shipmanagement at the time of the incident. All crew were Indian nationals and none were injured in the incident. The ship's owners, Shoei Kisen Kaisha, have liability coverage for $3.1 billion. Evergreen's Protection and Indemnity (third party) liabilities insurance coverage is provided by mutual UK P&I Club. The ship is insured in the Japanese market. Insurance industry sources say the ship's owners could be facing insurance claims for loss of revenue from the Suez Canal Authority (SCA) and from other ships whose passage has been impeded. Container ships of this size are typically insured for hull and machinery damage to an amount totalling between $100 and $140 million.

Prior to the incident, Ever Given had sailed through the canal 22 times. Bill Kavanagh, a National Maritime College of Ireland lecturer, and former captain, has described sailing through the Suez Canal as "a very complex and high risk operation". Wind gusts will cause the container areas of vessels to "act like a sail" and thus affect the course of the ship. The momentum of a heavy ship, such as Ever Given, is difficult to counteract if blown off course.

The government of Egypt requires ships traversing the canal to be boarded by an Egyptian "Suez crew", including one or more official maritime pilots from Egypt's SCA who command the ship, taking over from the regular crew and the captain. There were two Egyptian SCA pilots on board at the time of the accident.

Incident 

On 23 March 2021, at 07:40 EGY (05:40 UTC), Ever Given was travelling through the Suez Canal, when it was caught in a sandstorm. The strong winds, which exceeded , resulted in the "loss of the ability to steer the ship", causing the hull to deviate. The ship then ran aground at the  mark (measured from Port Said on the Mediterranean Sea;  from Suez Port on the Gulf of Suez), and turned sideways, unable to free itself, blocking the canal on both sides. The crew, consisting entirely of Indian nationals, was accounted for and no injuries were reported. At the time of the incident, the ship was travelling from Tanjung Pelepas, Malaysia, to the Port of Rotterdam, Netherlands. It was fifth in a northbound convoy, with fifteen vessels behind it when it ran aground near the village of Manshiyet Rugola.

According to an analysis of data from ship-tracking websites by Evert Lataire, head of Maritime Technology division at the University of Ghent, the bank effect, which may cause the stern of a ship to swing toward the near bank when operating in constricted waterway, may have contributed to the grounding, along with the lateral forces of west-to-east winds pushing sideways against the northbound ship. Since most of the focus of modern ship design is directed towards efficiency and stability at sea, the effects of hydrodynamics in shallow waters, especially in light of the rapidly growing size of ships in the past decade, remain somewhat obscure and in need of further study.

Over 300 vessels at both ends of the canal were obstructed by Ever Given, including five other container ships of similar size. These included 41 bulk carriers and 24 crude oil tankers. Some docked at ports and anchorages in the area, while many remained in place. The Ever Givens sister ship, Ever Greet, was affected by the disruption, as were two Russian Navy vessels:   and  Kola. These two vessels, believed to have been the only military vessels affected by the blockage, were conducting naval exercises in the area at the time.

Salvage and refloating

In the immediate aftermath of the grounding, the Suez Canal Authority engaged the Dutch company Royal Boskalis Westminster through its subsidiary Smit Salvage to manage marine salvage operations. Their team of experts worked in close collaboration with the Canal Authority, calculating the timing and direction of efforts, and coordinating a team of Egyptian, Dutch, and Japanese workers. Tugs were needed to apply force to move the ship, by towing or pushing, and suction dredgers to remove sand and silt from under the bow and stern of the ship. High-capacity pumps were to reduce or redistribute the weight of fuel oil and water ballast on the ship. If this was insufficient to refloat the ship, large floating cranes could be brought in to remove containers, but this would be a slow and difficult operation, because of the care needed to maintain the stability of the ship and avoid it breaking up.

As a first step, vessels were moved from behind Ever Given to make room for the refloating operation. Fuel and nine thousand tonnes of ballast water were removed from the ship to help lighten it as heavy machinery, including an excavator, began work to dig the bow out. By 25 March, eight tugboats were assisting in the attempt to pull it free. Peter Berdowski, Chief Executive of Boskalis, stated on 25 March that such an operation "can take days to weeks".

On 25 March, the SCA suspended navigation through the Suez Canal until Ever Given could be refloated. On the same day, Egyptian President Abdel Fattah el-Sisi's advisor on seaports stated that he expected the canal to be cleared in "48–72 hours, maximum". On the following day, the Suez Canal Authority said that its dredging operations were about 87 percent complete.

On 26 March, the SCA accepted an offer made by a United States Navy assessment team of dredging experts to assist in efforts to remove the ship.

On 27 March, the SCA said that 14 tugboats were trying to take advantage of that day's high tide and that more would arrive the following day if the attempt failed. Yukito Higaki, president of Shoei Kisen Kaisha, reported that the ship did not appear to be damaged, saying "The ship is not taking water. Once it refloats, it should be able to operate." There was no timeline for when the canal might be reopened. However, by 18:00 UTC, according to Egypt Today, the ship had moved by  towards the north. By 27 March, more than 300 ships were delayed at both ends and in the middle of the canal, with others still approaching and others having altered their routes. Delays were expected to persist for some time after Ever Given was freed, as vessels might face busy ports and additional delays before offloading.

Addressing a press conference, Osama Rabie, SCA chairman, said that weather conditions were "not the main reasons" for the ship's grounding, adding that "there may have been technical or human errors", and that all factors would be looked into in the investigation on the incident.

On 28 March, efforts to dislodge the ship allowed for some movement of the ship's stern and its rudder at high tide, and SCA chairman Rabie said that water has been running under the ship again, and that "at any time the ship could slide and move from the spot it is in", additionally noting he hoped it would not be necessary to remove some of the 18,300 TEU of containers on board the ship, despite strong tides and winds complicating recovery efforts. This came as the Egyptian President, Abdel Fattah el-Sisi, ordered preliminary preparations be made for lightening the ship's cargo. The seagoing tug Alp Guard, with a bollard pull of 285 tonnes, arrived that morning, almost doubling the towing capacity of the tugs.

The incident exposed a need to investigate issues of supply chain resilience and disruption to just-in-time manufacturing already facing shortages from COVID-19 pandemic impacts. The "complete disconnect of ship size development from developments in the actual economy" (OECD report, 2015), and the corresponding limitations of existing infrastructure to handle thema process evident in the Suez, where expansion work on the northern end of the canal has been ongoingled to the incident being described by Michael Safi in The Guardian as a "worst-case scenario that many saw coming". Events during the several days the canal was blocked highlighted the difficulties of saving larger ships, which requires more time and more equipment. If Ever Given had required intervention of floating cranes to remove some containers (assuming crane ships of sufficient capacity would have been available within any realistic time-frame), the process would have required larger equipment working for longer, and would have been likely to prolong the blockage by "days, even weeks".

On 29 March, the stern of Ever Given was refloated at 04:30 local time (02:30 UTC), and a second seagoing tug, the Italian Carlo Magno, with a bollard pull of 153 tonnes arrived, giving a further large increase in towing capacity. Ballast was adjusted, and towing timed to make maximum use of the ebbing tidal flow. At 15:05 local time (13:05 UTC), the ship was pulled free, following the king tide of a supermoon. It took 14 tug boats at high tide to dislodge the 224,000-ton vessel.

Satellite data showed that the ship's bow had been partly moved from the shore, although it remained stuck at the edge of the canal. The ship's stern had swung around and was in the middle of the waterway. The vessel was finally freed and moving again as of 15:05 local time, and was towed to the Great Bitter Lake for inspection. The canal authority informed shipping agencies that the canal was to reopen for shipping from 19:00 local time (17:00 UTC), after a search of the bottom and soil of the Suez Canal had found it was sound and had no issues. By the time traffic through the Suez Canal resumed, more than 400 ships were waiting: approximately 200 in the Red Sea, under 200 in the Mediterranean Sea; and around 50 in the Bitter Lakes.

Divers and the lead investigator for the SCA started inspecting the ship for damage, as well as probing the crew to determine the ultimate causes of the grounding, on 31 March. In the meantime, Ever Given was stationary in the Great Bitter Lake which forms part of the Suez Canal. The backlog of ships delayed by the blockage was finally cleared on 3 April.

In June 2021, the SCA stated that one person died during the six-day salvage operation.

Legal issues and seizure 
Merchant marine operations, both historically and currently, are complex, expensive, risky, and multi-jurisdictional as covered under centuries-old Admiralty law.

Legal compensation claims
On 3 April, the Suez Canal Authority (SCA) announced that the results of its ongoing investigation were expected to be announced within the next few days. The investigation had, however, taken more time to complete than anticipated, with promises made on 13 April to release investigation results by 18 April. As of 13 April, the ship remained in the lake, pending either a mutually satisfactory settlement for damages between the ship's owners and the SCA or the outcome of possible litigation of the same.

Due to the "labyrinthine ownership structure of container ships", as shown by a lawsuit filed against the ship's operator by the ship's Japanese owners, issues of jurisdiction and competing investigation results further complicated the matter. Requests for compensation by the SCA, for a billion dollar sum, on grounds of lost revenue and the cost of the salvage operation also delayed the voyage of Ever Given. The head of the SCA, Osama Rabie, noted that the ship could continue if the investigation concluded without incident and if an agreement was reached as to compensation. Legal battles could, however, prevent the departure of the ship. Concerns were raised for the crew, who would be effectively detained until the incident was resolved.

While the ship's owner indicated a willingness to agree to compensation, it might not shoulder the burden alone. The ship's Japanese owner, Shoei Kisen, declared "general average" on the morning of 4 April. This principle of maritime law states that "the owner of cargo on board a ship should contribute to the cost of rescuing the vessel during a major casualty event". Additional costs for owners of cargo could amount to a significant sum: the last time this was invoked, following the 2018 fire on the Maersk Honam, the adjustor fixed sums amounting to 54 per cent of cargo value for owners to release their cargo. This could be particularly damaging to owners of uninsured shipments, such as small businesses. The general average process was delayed by the seizure of the ship and of its cargo, as one of the key elements of the process is that "the goods and the ship must successfully reach the destination, otherwise, there is no general average", and the prospect of this happening was dramatically reduced by the ship's arrest. Further complications were caused by the huge amount of cargo interests involved, which would not only complicate an eventual discharge operation (which would be difficult with the existing facilities at Port Said) but also cause further paperwork issues.

A settlement was still under negotiation on April 6 between the ship's owners and the SCA, as Rabie told the Associated Press that he was hoping for an out-of-court settlement, arguing that "bringing the case before a court would be more harmful to the owners than settling with the SCA". The inquiry into the grounding progressed as investigators analysed data from the voyage data recorder (commonly referred to as a ship's "black box"), but no final conclusion had been reached, with Rabie telling he could not offer further details on an ongoing investigation.

A settlement, for an undisclosed amount, was finally agreed between the ship's owners and insurers and the SCA, on July 4, after an agreement on principle had been reached the month before. The compensation included the canal receiving a tug boat with a pulling capacity of about 75 tonnes. The ship was set to sail on July 7, with a ceremony to mark the event to be held at the canal authority's headquarters in Ismailia.

Seizure
On 13 April, the ship was seized by a court in Ismailia after a request by the SCA pending payment of compensations exceeding US$916 million, including 300 million for the salvage of the ship and 300 million for "loss of reputation", a demand which has been qualified by marine industry specialists, according to Lloyd's List, as an "outrageous" measure which is causing much unnecessary duress to both the crew of the ship and to the parties who shipped cargo on board the ship. The release date of the crew, who remain effectively detained on board, has not yet been announced, although two of the 25 Indian crewmembers on board were allowed to depart the vessel on 15 April due to "urgent personal circumstances". The ship's operator, Evergreen, was reportedly exploring options to transfer cargo from the ship to another, as to allow it to fulfill its delivery commitments for the containers on board, bound for the ship's ports of call in Rotterdam, Antwerp and Hamburg and other destinations in Northern Europe, although an Egyptian court later confirmed that the arrest affected both the ship and its cargo. A major concern remained for the crew, as it has not been unprecedented for a crew to be stuck for years while claims and disputes are resolved, a typically time-consuming process. Local seafarer union representatives visited the crew on 18 April in a show of solidarity, with one of the representatives noting they had discussions with the ship's captain and that the crew were eager to resume sailing. Parallels were made with the MV Aman (IMO 9215517), detained in the canal since July 2017 due to safety and regulatory issues and with one crew member obliged to remain on board as legal guardian. The International Labour Organization noted that this trend of "seafarer abandonment" was on the rise, and there were more than 250 known cases as of April 2021.

The ship's insurance company rejected the compensation claim, saying they were unjustified and excessive. On 16 April, it was also reported that the ship could be moved from its location on the Great Bitter Lake to Port Said, for further inspection: the ship's classification society had already issued a fitness certificate for such a journey to proceed. On 23 April, the ship's insurer, the British P&I Club, followed suit by lodging an appeal against the detention of the ship, on grounds that the arrest in respect of the cargo was invalid as well as that the compensation claim was unsubstantiated. This came off after previous unsuccessful negotiations, with the SCA instead blaming the ship's owner for being unwilling "to pay anything". This appeal was denied by an Egyptian judge on 4 May. Vessel owner Shoei Kisen Kaisha has notified owners of containers on board to take some responsibility for any compensation payment. The ultimate fate of the ship remains in a legal grey area.

Three further crew members whose contracts were expiring were allowed to leave the ship on 29 April. Day-to-day operations on board to ship, including routine safety drills and maintenance, were continuing as usual, with the ship's manager saying that "minimum safe manning standards for the vessel will be maintained at all times". According to the International Transport Workers' Federation (ITF), the crew was well cared for, although it stated that such situations highlight the necessity for port states to further protect seafarers' rights. The ITF also expressed concern at the stressful nature of the situation, due to the crew's status of being "human pawns in a wider game being played over compensation".

On 10 May, the SCA cut its compensation claims down to $600 million, after the rejection of the previous claim by both the ship's owner and the insurers.

On 7 July 2021, Egyptian authorities released the ship after an unspecified settlement was reached. It was announced that Egypt would also receive a 75-ton tugboat from the ship's Japanese owner, Shoei Kisen Kaisha, as part of the compensation package. Ever Given sailed to Port Said. Inspections were carried out, with the vessel finally departing on 12 July after a delay of more than 100 days. Ever Given departed for Rotterdam and Felixstowe for complete unloading, after which it was shortly taken out of service for inspection and maintenance. It resumed its voyages later in August, sailing through the canal again on 20 August en route to Qingdao for repairs, returning to regular service in mid-November 2021.

Economic impact

Rise in prices
Maritime and logistics experts warned that the incident would likely result in shipping delays of everyday items for customers around the world. Maritime historian Sal Mercogliano told the Associated Press: "Every day the canal is closed... container ships and tankers are not delivering food, fuel and manufactured goods to Europe and goods are not being exported from Europe to the Far East." Lloyd's List estimated during the blockage the value of the goods delayed each hour at US$400 million, and that every day it takes to clear the obstruction would disrupt an additional US$9 billion worth of goods. Rabie estimated that Egypt lost $12–14 million per day due to the closure. The SCA calculated it lost approximately US$15 million per day in transit fees. Despite the blockage, overall revenue for the first six months of 2021 was up by 8.8% to US$3 billion when compared with the same period the previous year.

Michael Lynch, president of Strategic Energy and Economic Research, attributed a rise in oil prices to "people buying in after recent declines in oil prices, with the Suez closing the trigger factor". James Williams, energy economist at WTRG Economics, said that in light of existing stocks "a few days of slowdown in [oil] delivery is not critical to the market". On the contrary, the oil prices had plummeted after the Suez Canal became unblocked on 29 March 2021, as a result of delayed supply of oil from other cargo ships.

Knock-on delays
The event delayed goods, which impacted industries with existing shortages, such as with semiconductors, thereby influencing markets already at risk of collapsing. To mitigate shortages of goods in the long term, future shipments could be ordered earlier than normal until the difference has been made up. However, a consultant at another firm noted that even a short-term disruption at the Suez Canal would have a domino effect for several months along the supply chain, an effect already apparent in the weeks following the incident. This kind of disruption is not unique to the incident: the historical trend for shipping rates to rise after interruptions in the supply chain is well documented, and analysists such as Ioannis Theotokas, professor of maritime studies at the University of Piraeus, noted that the crisis "led to a lot of losses for freight owners and charterers", and that a prolonged closure could have had impacts similar to the 1967 Arab-Israeli War. Some freight forwarders noted that demand for alternative means of transportation was expected to rise within the next few weeks on Europe to Asia routes, as a consequence of shippers seeking to avoid the disruption and uncertainty caused by the blockage of the canal. Following the resolution of the incident, forwarders in India noted difficulties with securing shipments to Europe or Africa, with many prior bookings cancelled and increased freight rates hitting small and medium-sized exporters particularly harshly. In England and across Europe, supply chain disruption from the canal incident, coupled with an already increased interest in gardening due to COVID-19 lockdowns, led to a shortage of garden gnomes.

Knock-on effects were equally noticeable in several European ports: despite ports anticipating delays and using the week-long lull of the Ever Given blockage to prepare, many had difficulties meeting-up with the demand of the resulting sudden spike in traffic. Shipping lines often discharged containers wherever possible, to be able to return to ports in Asia where several weeks of cargo were available at inflated rates, often prioritising the back-loading of empty containers and leaving urgent deliveries on the quay. Importers were advised of many cases where cargo was discharged, but at a port other than the expected destination, and that there were no schedules for further transport of said cargo, creating a "perfect storm" with no time nor capacity to spare for the delayed shipments. Congestion at Antwerp and Rotterdam was also delaying hinterland barge operations. The quick turn-around of ships in Europe was expected to have an overall positive impact on carrier's ability to recover their schedules, with disruption expected to be cleared up by early June, more than two months after Ever Given had been freed.

Alternative routes
The default alternative route for maritime traffic between Asia and Europe is to go around Africa via the Cape of Good Hope, a trip which can add up to two weeks to journey time, with this alternative having already been taken by some ships as of 26 March. Russia used the incident to promote its Arctic shipping routes as a shorter alternative to carrying goods around Africa.

Concerns about piracy, due to the unprecedented concentration of valuable shipping in such a small area, prompted shipping companies to make inquiries, at the time of the incident, to the Bahrain–based United States Fifth Fleet about security.

The incident highlighted the fragility of the global supply chain by causing tangible damage to businesses across the globe. Rising political tensions raise fears that ill-intentioned actors could similarly disrupt a tightly interconnected economy by weaponising its chokepoints in the future, and this despite the prohibition of waterway blockades under the 1888 Constantinople Convention, or that keeping chokepoints open is "essential for global trade".

Livestock
Concern was raised about livestock transported through the route, with 130,000 sheep being transported to Romania alone; Gabi Paun of Animals International stated "Every hour counts for the sheep and the fatality rate will only grow ... even if the law was respected and the ships were carrying 25% more food ... it would nonetheless have been finished by now". A previous 2020 report by the European Commission discovered many ships used for transporting animals were not fit for that purpose, and that oversight was lacking aboard ships of several member states, including Romania, France and Spain. Loading of livestock ships for exportation was temporarily suspended by the Romanian and Spanish authorities until the canal cleared.

In popular culture 
Various internet memes about the incident have been published, alongside numerous jokes. "Ever Given Ever Ywhere", a web app that allows users to place Ever Given anywhere in the world also went viral. Jokes and memes have been posted by users on mobile-platform TikTok depicting their personal interpretations of the incident. Individual suggestions for fixing the incident in a joking manner were also spread on Twitter, alongside comments over the relevance of some users' feeling that their personal issues corresponded to the ship being stuck. Mods were created for Microsoft Flight Simulator showing the ship grounded in the canal. On the day that the Ever Given was unblocked, Google celebrated the event by adding in an Easter egg where searching "Suez Canal" or "Ever Given" would display an animation of boats moving along the sidebar. Some commentators made humorous references to the 1982 book How to Avoid Huge Ships.

An April Fools' story published by The Guardian, claiming plans to build a second canal in Egypt, also gained traction in Turkish media, before it was marked as a fool at noon by The Guardian (as is common for such humorous fabrications).

Rumours targeting the first Egyptian female ship captain were also spread by some Middle Eastern sources, apparently based on a doctored Arab News publication. This highlighted issues of gender in the marine industry, where only 2% of the isolated and often hazardous jobs are held by women. The captain in question was first mate on board the Aida IV, which was hundreds of miles away in Alexandria at the time of the incident.

Depictions in media
In 2022, the American television show What We Do in the Shadows referenced the obstruction in its season four episode "Reunited." In the episode, vampire Nandor is stuck in a shipping container on the Ever Given.

See also 

 1974 Suez Canal Clearance Operation, a US-led operation to clear the canal of naval mines and wrecked ships after its closure in the Six-Day War
 Closure of the Suez Canal (1956–1957)
 Closure of the Suez Canal (1967–1975)
 High-speed railway to Eilat, a proposed railway in Israel that might act as a backup in case of another obstruction
 Yellow Fleet, a group of fifteen ships trapped in the canal from 1967 to 1975 as a result of the Six-Day War

Notes

References

External links

Chellel, Kit; Matthew Campbell; and K Oahn Ha; "Six Days in Suez: The Inside Story of the Ship That Broke Global Trade", Bloomberg Businessweek, 23 June 2021.
Live global map of marine traffic

2021 in Egypt
Internet memes introduced in 2021
March 2021 events in Africa
Maritime incidents in 2021
Maritime incidents in Egypt
Ship grounding
2021 obstruction
March 2021 events in Egypt

de:Ever Given#Sueskanal2021